Black Roulette is the second and final studio album by rapper DMG. It was released on January 28, 2003 through Rap-a-Lot Records, nearly ten years after his previous album, Rigormortiz, was released.

Track listing 
"All Balls, No Brains"- 4:32
"A.N.B"- 3:40
"Mind Games"- 2:25
"I Wish"- 3:45
"My Destiny"- 3:40
"If I Only Knew"- 4:05
"Headhunter"- 3:47 (Featuring G.Mone, Yukmouth)
"No Friends"- 2:27
"Nigga Luck"- 3:34 (Featuring Mad Dog)
"Who Am I?"- 3:48
"Ghetto Been Good 2 Me"- 4:00
"Too Long"- 3:37 (Featuring K.B., Man Child)

Personnel 
Executive Producer – Lil' J (2) (tracks: J Prince)
Producer – Domo (tracks: 3, 4, 7, 8, 9, 11), Mr. Lee (tracks: 1, 2, 5, 6), Swift (tracks: 10, 12)

External links 
 discogs

2003 albums
DMG (rapper) albums
Rap-A-Lot Records albums